Wanderer on the Edge of Time is the ninth album from progressive/thrash metal band Mekong Delta, released in June 2010. Chronicles of Chaos noted a firm combination of classical and acoustic music combined with the primary thrash metal genre, however it was felt that too many of the songs were repetitive - both of this album and of its predecessors.

Track listing
 Intro - Concert Guitar - 02:18
 Ouverture - 02:50
 "A certain fool" (Le fou) // Movement 1 - 03:37
 Interlude 1 - Group - 00:52
 "The 5th element" (Le Bateleur) // Movement 2 - 06:32
 Interlude 2 - Group - 00:34
 "The Apocalypt - World in shards" (La Maison Dieu) // Movement 3 - 05:43
 Interlude 3 - Concert Guitar - 02:03
 "King with broken crown" (Le Diable) // Movement 4 - 05:41
 Intermezzo (instrumental) // Movement 5 - 05:23
 Interlude 4 - Group - 02:11
 "Affection" (L'Amoureux) // Movement 6 - 02:53
 Interlude 5 - Group - 00:51
 "Mistaken truth" (Le Hérétique) // Movement 7 - 05:10
 Finale - 02:56

Band line-up
Ralph Hubert — bass guitar
Martin Lemar — vocals
Alex Landenburg — drums
Erik Adam H. Grösch — guitars
Benedikt Zimniak — guitars

Additional credits
Ralph Hubert — Producer, mixer
Erik Grösch — Co-producer, mixer
Eliran Kantor — Artwork and design

References

2010 albums
Mekong Delta (band) albums
Albums with cover art by Eliran Kantor